Józsi Jenő Tersánszky (12 September, 1888 —  12 June, 1969) is a Kossuth Prize-winning Hungarian writer. Tersánszky is considered one of the outstanding icons of 20th century Hungarian literature.

References

1888 births
1969 deaths
People from Baia Mare
Hungarian writers
Hungarian Roman Catholics
Hungarian journalists
Hungarian children's writers